Thomas Cartwright (1634–1689) was an English bishop and diarist, known as a supporter of James II.

Life
He was born and went to school in Northampton, and studied at the University of Oxford. He was first at Magdalen Hall, and then at Queen's College where he was tutored by Thomas Tully. He was ordained by Robert Skinner.

He was vicar of Walthamstow from 1658 to 1662. In 1660 he was made vicar of Barking by the Crown. He became an ardent supporter of the Restoration monarchy, and was made dean of Durham in 1672.

He was appointed bishop of Chester in 1686, by James II,  whose favourite Anglican clergyman he was. The appointment caused much scandal, as his moral character was said to be very bad. He became a member of the King's Ecclesiastical Commission. In October 1687 he was one of three Royal Commissioners, with Robert Wright and Sir Thomas Jenner, sent to Magdalen College, Oxford. They removed all but three of the Fellows.

After the Glorious Revolution he followed James II into exile. He died in Dublin, of dysentery, and is buried in Christ Church, Dublin. Despite his noted tolerance of the Roman Catholic faith, he refused firmly to convert to that communion on his death bed.

Family
Cartwright married a woman named Wight, by whom he had a numerous family. His eldest son, John, was in holy orders, and obtained preferment by the influence of his father. Five other sons, Richard, Gervas, Charles, Thomas, Henry, and two daughters, Alicia and Sarah, are mentioned in Cartwright's Diary.

Notes

Further reading
The Diary of Dr. Thomas Cartwright, Bishop of Chester (1843) Camden Society

Attribution

External links 

 Thomas Cartwright sermons, 1667 at Pitts Theology Library, Candler School of Theology

1634 births
1689 deaths
Bishops of Chester
British nonjuror bishops
Deans of Ripon
17th-century Church of England bishops